Atmospheric Research is a scientific journal dealing with the part of the atmosphere where meteorological events occur; intended for atmospheric scientists (such as meteorologists and climatologists), aerosol scientists, and hydrologists.  It is a highly international journal with attention given to all processes extending from the earth surface to the tropopause, but special emphasis continues to be devoted to the physics of clouds and precipitation, i.e. atmospheric aerosols; microphysical processes; cloud dynamics and thermodynamics; numerical simulation of cloud processes; clouds and radiation; meso- and macrostructure of clouds and cloud systems, and weather modification.

See also
Atmospheric science
 List of scientific journals
 List of scientific journals in earth and atmospheric sciences

External links 
 Elsevier summary

Meteorology journals
Elsevier academic journals